Faversham was a parliamentary constituency centred on the town of Faversham in Kent which returned one Member of Parliament (MP)  to the House of Commons of the Parliament of the United Kingdom.

It was created for the 1885 general election, and abolished for the 1997 general election when it was replaced by the new constituencies of Sittingbourne and Sheppey, and Faversham and Mid Kent.

Boundaries
1885–1918: 
The Borough of Faversham
the Sessional Division of Faversham
the corporate town of Queenborough

1918–1950: 
the Boroughs of Faversham and Queenborough, 
the Urban Districts of Milton Regis, 
Sheerness, and Sittingbourne, 
the Rural Districts of Milton and Sheppey, 
the Rural District of Faversham (except the detached parts of the parishes of Dunkirk and Hernhill which were wholly surrounded by the Rural District of Blean)

1950–1983: 
the Boroughs of Faversham and Queenborough
the Urban Districts of Sheerness, Sittingbourne and Milton
the Rural Districts of Sheppey and Swale

1983–1997: 
the Borough of Swale wards of Abbey, Borden, Davington Priory, East Downs, Eastern, Grove, Iwade and Lower Halstow
Kemsley
Milton Regis
Minster Cliffs
Murston
Newington
Queenborough and Halfway
Roman
St Ann's
Sheerness East
Sheerness West
Sheppey Central
Teynham and Lynsted
Watling
West Downs
Woodstock

Members of Parliament

Elections

Elections in the 1880s

Elections in the 1890s

Elections in the 1900s

Elections in the 1910s 

General Election 1914–15:

Another General Election was required to take place before the end of 1915. The political parties had been making preparations for an election to take place and by July 1914, the following candidates had been selected; 
Unionist: Granville Wheler
Liberal: 
Labour: Stanley Morgan

Elections in the 1920s

Elections in the 1930s 

General Election 1939–40

Another General Election was required to take place before the end of 1940. The political parties had been making preparations for an election to take place and by the Autumn of 1939, the following candidates had been selected; 
Conservative: Adam Maitland
Labour: John Belcher

Elections in the 1940s

Elections in the 1950s

Elections in the 1960s

Elections in the 1970s

Elections in the 1980s

Elections in the 1990s

References
British parliamentary election results, 1885-1918 by Fred W. S. Craig

Politics of Swale
Constituencies of the Parliament of the United Kingdom established in 1885
Constituencies of the Parliament of the United Kingdom disestablished in 1997
Parliamentary constituencies in Kent (historic)